Asbury United Methodist Church,  originally known as Asbury Chapel, is a historic United Methodist church in Northwest Washington, D.C., built on the corner of 11th and K Streets. It was placed on the District of Columbia Register of Historic Places on November 1, 1986.  It was added to the National Register of Historic Places in 1986.  In 2003, the National Park Service approved the listing of Asbury on the National Underground Railroad Network to Freedom.

History
Asbury United Methodist Church is notable due to its historical association with African-American Methodism in Washington, D.C. and is the oldest black Methodist church in the city. The church was founded in 1836 and has a legacy of involvement in social history through abolition, emancipation, reconstruction, and the civil rights movement.  It is the city's oldest African-American church to remain on its original site.  A new building on the same site was completed in 1870. The current building was designed by Clarence Lowell Handing and built in 1915–1916. It is English Gothic Revival architecture.

The Church is also noted for one of the largest recorded nonviolent escape attempts in the United states, known as The Pearl incident. On April 15, 1848, seventy-five slaves attempted to flee Washington D.C. on the schooner called The Pearl.

The Pearl incident was the largest recorded nonviolent escape attempt by enslaved people in United States history. On April 15, 1848, seventy-seven slaves attempted to escape Washington D.C. by sailing away on a schooner called The Pearl.

In the 1920s, the building had alterations by African American architect, William Wilson Cooke.

In December 2020 the congregation's Black Lives Matter banner was burned during an event for President Donald Trump, an action the congregation's senior pastor described as "reminiscent of cross burnings". In January 2021 Enrique Tarrio, chairman of the Proud Boys, was arrested in relation to the incident.

On July 15, 2021, the National Trust for Historic Preservation announced Asbury United Church as one of 40 sites and organizations to receive $3 Million in grants from the African American Cultural Heritage Action Fund.  The grant is to be used for repairs to the church’s wood windows and Bell Tower masonry, as well as repointing and cleaning of its stone facade.

References

External links 
 

African-American history of Washington, D.C.
Black Lives Matter
Churches on the National Register of Historic Places in Washington, D.C.
United Methodist churches in Washington, D.C.